Kotmale Biyagama transmission line is one of Sri Lanka's critical transmission lines that connects the load center Colombo to hydroelectricity generation of Mahaweli Complex.

References

Electric power infrastructure in Sri Lanka